Daniel John Pollock (24 August 1968 – 13 April 1992) was an Australian film actor. He was perhaps best known for his role as Davey in the 1992 drama film Romper Stomper.

Personal life
Pollock was born in Melbourne, Victoria, the son of John and Lucy Pollock. Pollock attended Swinburne Senior Community School in the Melbourne suburb of Hawthorn in the mid-1980s.

Career
Pollock acted in the films Lover Boy (1989), Nirvana Street Murder (1990), Death in Brunswick (1991) and Proof (1991).

Pollock's last performance was in the 1992 film Romper Stomper alongside New Zealand actor Russell Crowe. Pollock was posthumously nominated for Best Supporting Actor at the 1992 AFI Awards for the role.

Death
On 13 April 1992, 23-year-old Pollock, battling depression and fearing a prison sentence in an upcoming court case, committed suicide by walking in front of a train at Newtown railway station, Sydney, prior to the release of Romper Stomper.  He was buried next to his grandfather William "Bill" Pollock in Gol Gol, New South Wales.

Russell Crowe, Pollock's Romper Stomper co-star, wrote a song in 2001, called "The Night That Davey Hit the Train", about his death.

Filmography

Films
 Tax (1987)
 Salt, Saliva, Sperm and Sweat (1988)
 Lover Boy (1989)
 Nirvana Street Murder (1990)
 Boys in the Island (1990)
 Death in Brunswick (1991)
 Proof (1991)
 Romper Stomper (1992)

Television series
 Kelly (1992)

References

External links

Tribute webpage created by Daniel Pollock's family

1968 births
1992 deaths
1992 suicides
20th-century Australian male actors
Australian male film actors
Male actors from Melbourne
Suicides by train
Suicides in New South Wales